Kim Sung-hwan (born 13 April 1953) was the Republic of Korea’s Minister of Foreign Affairs and Trade from 8 October 2010 to 24 February 2013. His previous positions include Vice Minister of Foreign Affairs and Trade (from March 2008) and Senior Secretary to the President for Foreign Affairs and National Security (from June 2008).

References

External links 

 Biography at the ministry's website, with links to press releases and press briefings

1953 births
Government ministers of South Korea
South Korean diplomats
South Korean Roman Catholics
Living people
People from Seoul
Foreign ministers of South Korea
Seoul National University alumni
Ambassadors of South Korea to Austria